In meteorology, an inversion is a deviation from the normal change of an atmospheric property with altitude. It almost always refers to an inversion of the air temperature lapse rate, in which case it is called a temperature inversion. Normally, air temperature decreases with an increase in altitude, but during an inversion warmer air is held above cooler air.

An inversion traps air pollution, such as smog, close to the ground. An inversion can also suppress convection by acting as a "cap.". If this cap is broken for any of several reasons, convection of any moisture present can then erupt into violent thunderstorms. Temperature inversion can notoriously result in freezing rain in cold climates.

Normal atmospheric conditions
Usually, within the lower atmosphere (the troposphere) the air near the surface of the Earth is warmer than the air above it, largely because the atmosphere is heated from below as solar radiation warms the Earth's surface, which in turn then warms the layer of the atmosphere directly above it, e.g., by thermals (convective heat transfer). Air temperature also decreases with an increase in altitude because higher air is at lower pressure, and lower pressure results in a lower temperature, following the ideal gas law and adiabatic lapse rate.

Causes

Under the right conditions, the normal vertical temperature gradient is inverted so that the air is colder near the surface of the Earth. This can occur when, for example, a warmer, less-dense air mass moves over a cooler, denser air mass. This type of inversion occurs in the vicinity of warm fronts, and also in areas of oceanic upwelling such as along the California coast in the United States. With sufficient humidity in the cooler layer, fog is typically present below the inversion cap. An inversion is also produced whenever radiation from the surface of the earth exceeds the amount of radiation received from the sun, which commonly occurs at night, or during the winter when the sun is very low in the sky. This effect is virtually confined to land regions as the ocean retains heat far longer. In the polar regions during winter, inversions are nearly always present over land.

A warmer air mass moving over a cooler one can "shut off" any convection which may be present in the cooler air mass: this is known as a capping inversion. However, if this cap is broken, either by extreme convection overcoming the cap or by the lifting effect of a front or a mountain range, the sudden release of bottled-up convective energy—like the bursting of a balloon—can result in severe thunderstorms. Such capping inversions typically precede the development of tornadoes in the Midwestern United States. In this instance, the "cooler" layer is quite warm but is still denser and usually cooler than the lower part of the inversion layer capping it.

Subsidence inversion
An inversion can develop aloft as a result of air gradually sinking over a wide area and being warmed by adiabatic compression, usually associated with subtropical high-pressure areas. A stable marine layer may then develop over the ocean as a result. As this layer moves over progressively warmer waters, however, turbulence within the marine layer can gradually lift the inversion layer to higher altitudes, and eventually even pierce it, producing thunderstorms, and under the right circumstances, tropical cyclones. The accumulated smog and dust under the inversion quickly taints the sky reddish, easily seen on sunny days.

Atmospheric consequences

Temperature inversions stop atmospheric convection (which is normally present) from happening in the affected area and can lead to high concentrations of atmospheric pollutants. Cities especially suffer from the effects of temperature inversions because they both produce more atmospheric pollutants and have higher thermal masses than rural areas, resulting in more frequent inversions with higher concentrations of pollutants. The effects are even more pronounced when a city is surrounded by hills or mountains since they form an additional barrier to air circulation. During a severe inversion, trapped air pollutants form a brownish haze that can cause respiratory problems. The Great Smog of 1952 in London, England, is one of the most serious examples of such an inversion. It was blamed for an estimated 10,000 to 12,000 deaths.

Sometimes the inversion layer is at a high enough altitude that cumulus clouds can condense but can only spread out under the inversion layer. This decreases the amount of sunlight reaching the ground and prevents new thermals from forming. As the clouds disperse, sunny weather replaces cloudiness in a cycle that can occur more than once a day.

Wave propagation

Light
As the temperature of air increases, the index of refraction of air decreases, a side effect of hotter air being less dense. Normally this results in distant objects being shortened vertically, an effect that is easy to see at sunset when the sun is visible as an oval. In an inversion, the normal pattern is reversed, and distant objects are instead stretched out or appear to be above the horizon, leading to the phenomenon known as a Fata Morgana or mirage.

Inversions can magnify the so-called "green flash"—a phenomenon occurring at sunrise or sunset, usually visible for a few seconds, in which the sun's green light is isolated due to dispersion. The shorter wavelength is refracted most, with the blue component of sunlight "completely scattered out by Rayleigh scattering", making green the first or last light from the upper rim of the solar disc to be seen.

Radio waves

Very high frequency radio waves can be refracted by inversions, making it possible to hear FM radio or watch VHF low-band television broadcasts from long distances on foggy nights. The signal, which would normally be refracted up and away into space, is instead refracted down towards the earth by the temperature-inversion boundary layer. This phenomenon is called tropospheric ducting. Along coastlines during Autumn and Spring, due to multiple stations being simultaneously present because of reduced propagation losses, many FM radio stations are plagued by severe signal degradation disrupting reception.
In higher frequencies such as microwaves, such refraction causes multipath propagation and fading.

Sound
When an inversion layer is present, if a sound or explosion occurs at ground level, the sound wave is refracted by the temperature gradient (which affects sound speed) and returns to the ground. The sound, therefore, travels much better than normal. This is noticeable in areas around airports, where the sound of aircraft taking off and landing often can be heard at greater distances around dawn than at other times of day, and inversion thunder which is significantly louder and travels further than when it is produced by lightning strikes under normal conditions.

Shock waves
The shock wave from an explosion can be reflected by an inversion layer in much the same way as it bounces off the ground in an air-burst and can cause additional damage as a result. This phenomenon killed two people in the Soviet RDS-37 nuclear test when a building collapsed.

See also

 Index of meteorology articles

References

External links

Atmospheric thermodynamics
Radio frequency propagation